Kenner Products, known simply as Kenner, was an American toy company founded in 1946. Throughout its history, the Kenner brand produced several highly recognizable toys and merchandise lines including action figures like the original series of Star Wars, Jurassic Park and Batman as well as die cast models. The company was closed by its corporate parent Hasbro in 2000.

History 
Kenner was founded in 1946 in Cincinnati, Ohio, by brothers Albert, Phillip and Joseph L. Steiner. The company was named after the street where the original corporate offices were located, just north of Cincinnati Union Terminal. It was a pioneer in the use of television advertisement for the marketing of merchandise across the United States, beginning in 1958.

In the early 1960s, Kenner introduced its corporate mascot, The Kenner Gooney Bird, which would be used in both its company logo ("It's Kenner! It's fun!") and TV ads, in both animated form and puppetry. One commercial was produced by Muppets creator Jim Henson and featured a puppet that would later become the Sesame Street character Little Bird. The Bird was phased out by 1974.

The company was purchased by General Mills in 1967. In 1971, General Mills merged its Rainbow Crafts division into Kenner, bringing Play-Doh into the Kenner product line. In 1985, General Mills would spin-off both its Kenner and Parker Brothers toy divisions to form Kenner Parker Toys, Inc. The following year Kenner Parker sold off its Lionel Trains division.

Kenner Parker was acquired by Tonka in 1987. Under Tonka management, Kenner Products was reconstituted as a division. Tonka (including Kenner) was purchased by the toy company Hasbro in mid-1991. Hasbro closed the Cincinnati offices of Kenner in 2000, and Kenner's product lines were merged into Hasbro's.

Products and product lines 
One of Kenner's original products was the "Bubble-Matic," a toy gun that blew bubbles.  An "updated" version was available at least as late as the mid-1960s. Kenner introduced its popular Girder and Panel building sets construction toy in 1957, the Give-a-Show projector in 1959, the Easy-Bake Oven in 1963, the Electric Mold Master also in 1963, the Spirograph drawing toy in 1966, and the Starting Lineup sports action figure collectible line in 1988.

Kenner Products obtained the rights to produce Star Wars action figures and playsets for the Star Wars trilogy from 1976 through 1985. After Kenner acquired the license to produce Star Wars toys when the Mego Corporation rejected it in 1976, Kenner popularized the 3.75 inch action figure that became an industry standard that continues to dominate the action figure toy market. Kenner also produced toys related to the popular 1970s TV series The Six Million Dollar Man and the 1979 sci-fi movie Alien.  In 1981, Kenner belatedly entered the diecast toy car market, with a short-lived range called Fast 111's. The 1980s also saw the release of the "Fashion Star Fillies" line of model horses, a product discontinued by the end of the decade.

One of Kenner's most highly acclaimed lines was the Super Powers Collection, produced from 1984 to 1986. These action figures were based on the famed superheroes of DC Comics.  What made the line so successful was that the characters were modeled almost exactly from the style guide of the company; and also, each character performed some "action." For example, if Superman's legs are squeezed, he would throw a punch. Furthermore, Kenner was able to commission some of the characters' creators like Jack Kirby for his New Gods characters and George Perez for Cyborg to design the action figures. In 1985, DC Comics named Kenner as one of the honorees in the company's 50th anniversary publication Fifty Who Made DC Great for its work on the Super Powers Collection.

One of the more popular action figure lines in the late 1980s was Kenner's The Real Ghostbusters, based on the 1986-1991 animated series adaptation of the 1984 feature film Ghostbusters. The toy line debuted the same year as the cartoon and continued production through most of its run. Although the initial releases accurately resembled The Real Ghostbusters cartoon designs, unlike Super Powers, the toy line very soon stopped attempting to be faithful to the existing source material. Instead, new, original costumes, weapons and ghost characters were designed by Kenner, many of them centered on unique action features, similar to those popularized by Mattel's competing Masters of the Universe toy line as well as Kenner's earlier Super Powers toy line.

This idea of basing a toy line on well-known characters but then coming up with original designs that were not based on any published storylines represented a major shift in the design approach to action figure toy lines at the time. In previous years, one major approach to producing toy lines was to base them closely on popular, well-known characters from properties like Star Wars, Marvel Comics, or DC Comics. The other major approach was for the toy companies to invent their own original characters and then help produce comic books and cartoons that promoted those exact designs (e.g., Hasbro's G.I. Joe and Transformers and Mattel's Masters of the Universe). In a departure from this, Kenner did not have any arrangement to incorporate their new concepts and designs into The Real Ghostbusters cartoons or comic books.

This looser approach to the source material of licensed toy lines continued with Kenner's Dark Knight Collection, launched in 1990 and the first of their numerous lines based on the Batman character. This initial set was created to capitalize on the phenomenal success of the cinematic version of the character, releasing vehicles (such as the Batmobile or Batplane) inspired on the highly successful 1989 film. Kenner also made vehicles from the Batman Forever movie (1995). Later toy lines expanded beyond the movie series and took inspiration from Batman's animated series and comic book incarnations. Kenner went on to develop lines centered on Superman and other DC Comics characters as well. As with The Real Ghostbusters, most of these DC Comics lines incorporated multi-colored costumes, weapons and action features which were not based directly on any existing storylines, although the character names and likenesses were typically drawn from the source material. This design approach to the DC Comics toy lines was continued to a large extent by Mattel when they took over the DC Comics license and produced lines based on the movies Batman Begins, The Dark Knight and Superman Returns as well as the Justice League cartoons. Hasbro, Kenner's eventual buyer, has taken a similar approach with some of their action figure lines, most notably on their 2010 3.75" Spider-Man action figure line as well as some of their 2009 G.I. Joe: The Rise of Cobra product.

In 1998, the Jurassic Park: Chaos Effect line was released but sales were less than expected. The Night Hunter series, the second line of toys based on Chaos Effect, was planned for 1999, but was cancelled due to poor sales. The Jurassic Park series became more of an annoyance to Hasbro rather than a trademark brand name. Due to this, the overproduction of Star Wars: Episode I – The Phantom Menace toys, coupled with low sales, forced Hasbro to downsize by getting rid of the Kenner department in Cincinnati. 100 people were transferred and 420 were laid off. Among these 420 was the Jurassic Park design team (which also designed Batman among other toy lines), who had just started the very early concepts for Jurassic Park III. Because of this, Hasbro assigned the toys from Jurassic Park III to their Star Wars design team, who scaled the humans to be in size with Star Wars figures and made the style of the toys similar to the ones from Star Wars: Episode II – Attack of the Clones.

In 2010, Hasbro began releasing modern Star Wars action figures with packaging reminiscent of the original Kenner 1978–1984 Star Wars product line. Star Wars: The Vintage Collection is composed of new highly pose-able figures, with screen-accurate likenesses. Hasbro had done this twice before, with the 2004 "vintage" Original Trilogy Collection and the 2006–2007 "vintage" Saga Collection but this is the first time that their Star Wars line was entirely dedicated to replica Kenner carded figures.

List of product lines 

 Alien
 Baby Alive
 Banjo-Matic
 Batman & Robin
 Batman Forever
 Batman Returns
 Batman: The Animated Series
 Batman Total Justice
 Battle Brawlers
 Beast Machines: Transformers
 Beast Wars: Transformers
 Beat the Buzz
 Beetlejuice
 Big Burger Grill
 Bill and Ted's Excellent Adventures
 The Bionic Woman
 Blythe
 Bone Age
 Bubbl-Matic
 Building Blasters
 Building Boulders, Flintstones
 Butch and Sundance: The Early Days
 Capitol Critters
 Captain Planet and the Planeteers 
 Care Bears
 Care Bear Cousins
 Cassette Movie Projector
 Centurions
 Chuck Norris: Karate Kommandos
 Close 'n Play
 Congo
 Daddy Saddle
 Darci Covergirl
 Dragonheart
 Duke
 Dusty 
 Easy Bake Oven
 Fairy Winkles
 Fashion Star Fillies
 Fast 111's
 Finger Pops
 Fluppy Dogs
 G.I. Joe Extreme
 Gargoyles
 Girder and Panel building sets
  Give-A-Show Projector
 Glamour Gals
 Gun That Shoots Around the Corner
 Hardy Boys, The
 Home Workshop, Motorized
 Hugga Bunch
 Hugo
 Jurassic Park
 Knight Rider
 Li'l Loggers
 Littlest Pet Shop
 Mega Force 
 Megabug Gladiators
 M.A.S.K.
 Milky, the Marvelous Milking Cow
 Movie Viewer 
 Mummies Alive!
 My Magic Genie
 Pistol That Shoots Around the Corner
 Play-Doh
 Play 'n Play Back Organ
 Police Academy
 Power Sub
 Predator
 Raiders of the Lost Ark
 The Real Ghostbusters
 Red Line
 Robin Hood: Prince of Thieves
 RoboCop: The Animated Series
 Robotman & Stellar
 Rose Petal Place
 Rotodraw
 Run Joe Run
 Savage Mondo Blitzers
 Say It! Play It! 
 Scuba Squad
 Sea Wees
 The Shadow
 Shadow Strikers
 SilverHawks
 Steel
 Technozoids (Zoids)
 Sip-Along Sam
 The Six Million Dollar Man
 Sky Commanders
 Small Soldiers
 Spirograph
 SSP Cars and Smash Up Derby
 Super Sonic Power
 Star Wars
 Starting Lineup
 Strawberry Shortcake
 Stretch Armstrong
 Super Powers Collection
 Superman: The Animated Series
 Swamp Thing
 Terminator 2: Judgment Day
 Turn-A-Tune
 VR Troopers
 Vor-Tech
 Waterworld
 Wish World Kids
 XRC
 Zippity Speedway
 Zoom-Loom Automatic Weaving Machine

See also  
 Super Powers Collection

References

External links 
 The History of Kenner on KennerToys.com (archived)
 Kenner Action Figures on The Old Toy Guide (archived)

Defunct companies based in Cincinnati
Toy companies of the United States
Toy companies established in 1947
Manufacturing companies disestablished in 2000
Former Hasbro subsidiaries
1947 establishments in Ohio
2000 disestablishments in Ohio
1967 mergers and acquisitions
1987 mergers and acquisitions
1991 mergers and acquisitions